Soyuz 20 (Union 20) was an unmanned spacecraft launched by the Soviet Union. It was a long-duration test of the Soyuz spacecraft that docked with the Salyut 4 space station. Soyuz 20 performed comprehensive checking of improved on-board systems of the spacecraft under various flight conditions. It also carried a biological payload. Living organisms were exposed to three months in space.

Mission parameters 
Mass:  
Perigee: 
Apogee: 
Inclination: 51.6°
Period: 88.8 minutes

Return 
It was recovered on 16 February 1976 at 02:24 UTC.

References 

Soyuz uncrewed test flights
Spacecraft launched in 1975
Spacecraft which reentered in 1976
Spacecraft launched by Soyuz-U rockets